Alcohol laws are laws in relation to the manufacture, use, being under the influence of and sale of alcohol (also known formally as ethanol) or alcoholic beverages that contains ethanol. Common alcoholic beverages include beer, wine, (hard) cider, and distilled spirits (e.g., vodka, rum, gin). The United States defines an alcoholic beverage as "any beverage in liquid form which contains not less than one-half of one percent of alcohol by volume", but this definition varies internationally. These laws can restrict those who can produce alcohol, those who can buy it (often with minimum age restrictions and laws against selling to an already intoxicated person), when one can buy it (with hours of serving and/or days of selling set out), labelling and advertising, the types of alcoholic beverage that can be sold (e.g., some stores can only sell beer and wine), where one can consume it (e.g., drinking in public is not legal in many parts of the US), what activities are prohibited while intoxicated. (e.g., drunk driving), and where one can buy it. In some cases, laws have even prohibited the use and sale of alcohol entirely, as with Prohibition in the United States from 1920 to 1933.

Temperance movement 

The temperance movement is a social movement against the consumption of alcoholic beverages. Participants in the movement typically criticize alcohol intoxication or promote complete abstinence (teetotalism), with leaders emphasizing alcohol's negative effects on health, personality, and family life. Typically the movement promotes alcohol education, as well as demands new laws against the selling of alcoholic drinks, or those regulating the availability of alcohol, or those completely prohibiting it. During the 19th and early 20th centuries, the Temperance Movement became prominent in many countries, particularly English-speaking and Scandinavian ones, and it led to Prohibition in the United States from 1920 to 1933.

Alcohol laws by country 
 Australia
 Germany
 Hong Kong
 India
 Ireland
 Turkey
 United Kingdom
 United States

Prohibition

Outright prohibition of alcohol 

Some countries forbid alcoholic beverages or have forbidden them in the past. People trying to get around prohibition turn to smuggling of alcohol – known as bootlegging or rum-running – or make moonshine, a distilled beverage in an unlicensed still.

Canada 

Canada imposed prohibition at the beginning of the 20th century, but repealed it in the 1920s.

India 

In India, manufacture, sale or consumption of alcohol is prohibited in the states of Bihar, Gujarat, Manipur and Nagaland, as well as the union territory of Lakshadweep. Prohibition has become controversial in Gujarat, following a July 2009 incident in which widespread poisoning resulted from alcohol that had been sold illegally.

All Indian states observe dry days on major religious festivals/occasions depending on the popularity of the festival in that region. Dry days are specific days when the sale of alcohol is banned, although consumption is permitted. Dry days are also observed on voting days. Dry days are fixed by the respective state government. National holidays such as Republic Day (26 January), Independence Day (15 August) and Gandhi Jayanthi (2 October) are usually dry days throughout India.

Nordic countries 
Two Nordic countries (Finland and Norway) had a period of alcohol prohibition in the early 20th century.

In Sweden, prohibition was heavily discussed, but never introduced, replaced by strict rationing and later by more lax regulation, which included allowing alcohol to be sold on Saturdays.

Following the end of prohibition, government alcohol monopolies were established with detailed restrictions and high taxes. Some of these restrictions have since been lifted. For example, supermarkets in Finland were allowed to sell only fermented beverages with an alcohol content up to 4.7% ABV, but Alko, the government monopoly, is allowed to sell wine and spirits. The alcohol law in Finland was changed in 2018, allowing grocery stores to sell beverages with an alcohol content up to 5.5% ABV. This is also the case with the Norwegian Vinmonopolet and the Swedish Systembolaget (though in Sweden the limit for allowed ABV in supermarkets is 3.5%.)

United States 

In the United States, there was an attempt from 1919 to 1933 to eliminate the drinking of alcoholic beverages by means of a national prohibition of their manufacture and sale. This period became known as the Prohibition era. During this time, the 18th Amendment to the Constitution of the United States made the manufacture, sale, and transportation of alcoholic beverages illegal throughout the United States.

Prohibition led to the unintended consequence of causing widespread disrespect for the law, as many people procured alcoholic beverages from illegal sources. In this way, a lucrative business was created for illegal producers and sellers of alcohol, which led to the development of organized crime. As a result, Prohibition became extremely unpopular, which ultimately led to the repeal of the 18th Amendment in 1933 via the adoption of the 21st Amendment to the Constitution.

Prior to national Prohibition, beginning in the late 19th century, many states and localities had enacted Prohibition within their jurisdictions. After the repeal of the 18th Amendment, some localities (known as dry counties) continue to ban the sale of alcohol, but often not possession or consumption.

Between 1832 and 1953, US federal law prohibited the sale of alcohol to Native Americans. The federal legislation was repealed in 1953, and within a few years, most tribes passed their own prohibition laws. As of 2007, 63% of the federally recognized tribes in the lower 48 states had legalized alcohol sales on their reservations.

Majority-Muslim countries 
Some majority-Muslim countries, such as Saudi Arabia, Kuwait, Pakistan, Iran, Somalia, Libya, Yemen, etc. prohibit the production, sale, and consumption of alcoholic beverages either entirely or for its Muslim citizens because they are considered haram (forbidden) in Islam. Alcohol was illegal in Sudan but, it was legalized for non-Muslims in July 2020. Other Muslim countries have it either illegal in certain parts or by non-Muslims.

Afghanistan 
Alcohol is completely illegal in Afghanistan. Alcohol, especially wine, was popular for thousands of years in what is now Afghanistan. The Taliban banned alcohol during its rule from 1996 to 2001 as well as after the Afghan government collapsed in 2021. Prior to the collapse of the Afghan government, alcohol licenses were given to journalists and tourists and bringing up to 2 liters was legal. There does however remain a huge black market for alcohol in Afghanistan, especially in Kabul and Herat.

Algeria 
What is now Algeria has been known for its wine for thousands of years. It is illegal to drink in public in Algeria. Alcohol can be drunk in restaurants, bars and hotels.

Bangladesh 
In Bangladesh, alcohol is illegal for Muslims. It is legal for non-Muslims to drink with a permit. It is only legal for Muslims "under medical circumstances" with a doctor's permit.
In 2022, the laws were revised to allow hotels, restaurants, and outlets that serve food as well as display and sell alcohol to apply for liquor sale licenses. Those over 21 can apply for a drinking permit, while Muslims must get a prescription from a doctor with at least an associate professor rank.

Egypt 
Ancient Egypt was widely known for its beer. In Egypt, drinking alcohol is illegal in public as well as shops and sales are banned for Muslims during Ramadan. Alcohol is legal in bars, hotels and tourist facilities approved by the Minister of Tourism.

Indonesia 
Alcohol is legal in Indonesia with the exception of Aceh.

Iran 
Prior to the establishment of the Islamic republic, alcohol was accessible in Iran. Ancient Persia was known for its wine and it was even common for Saffarid and Samanid rulers. After the Iranian revolution in 1979, alcohol became completely illegal for Muslims, however there is a major black market and underground scene for alcohol. A popular moonshine is Aragh sagi, distilled from raisins. Smuggling alcohol into Iran is highly illegal and is punishable by death. The only legal alcohol in Iran is home production for recognized non-Muslim minorities such as Armenians, Assyrians, and Zoroastrians. The Jewish community in Iran is also allowed to produce and drink its own wine for the Sabbath.

Iraq 
What is now Iraq is one of the oldest producers of beer. Buying alcohol is especially prevalent in larger cities by shops owned by Christians. Parts ruled by the Islamic State of Iraq and the Levant completely banned alcohol, with a death penalty. In 2016, the Iraqi parliament passed a law banning alcohol, fining 25 million Iraqi dinars however it is unclear how it can be enforced and could be struck down by the Supreme Court. The president at the time, Fuad Masum called for the law to be revised.

Jordan 
Alcohol is legal in Jordan, however public drinking is illegal. Restaurants, bars, hotels, etc. serve alcohol legally.

Malaysia 
Alcohol is mostly legal in Malaysia with the exceptions of Kelantan and Terengganu for Muslims.

Morocco 
Although alcohol is legal in Morocco, it is illegal to drink in public. Alcohol can be drunk in hotels, bars and licensed tourist areas. There is also a separate section in supermarkets for alcohol.

Pakistan 

After its independence in 1947, Pakistani law was fairly liberal regarding liquor laws. Major cities had a culture of drinking, and alcohol was readily available until the 1970s when prohibition was introduced for Muslim citizens. However it remains widely available in urban Pakistan through bootleggers and also through the diplomatic staff of some minor countries. Advertising alcohol isn't illegal, although cultural taboos often prevent people from talking about it in public. Foreigners and non-Muslims are less likely to be barred from buying alcohol and some local producers with special licenses will even assist them with the purchase.

Somalia 
Alcohol is illegal in both Somalia and the autonomous Somaliland. During the Italian Somalia period, rum was produced and continued until the fall of Siad Barre’s government in 1991.

Sudan 
Alcohol is illegal for Muslims in Sudan. In 2020, Sudan legalized alcohol for non Muslims in private.

Syria 
Alcohol is completely legal in Syria, however in parts ruled by the Islamic State of Iraq and the Levant, it was illegal with a penalty of death.

Tunisia 
Alcohol is completely legal in Tunisia, however, sales are banned on Fridays as well as during Ramadan.

United Arab Emirates 
Prior to 2020, a license was required to handle alcohol, whether it be drinking, selling or transporting. It was illegal for Muslims to drink before. Alcohol is completely illegal in the emirate of Sharjah. In 2020, the license requirement was removed for authorized areas. The drinking age in the UAE is 21.

Yemen 
Alcohol is illegal in Yemen. Prior to the Yemeni Civil War, it was legal for tourists in hotels in the cities of Aden and Sana'a.

Drunk driving laws 

Most countries have drunk driving laws which limit how much alcohol a person can consume before driving a car on a road. The permitted blood alcohol content threshold ranges from 0.0% to 0.08%.

Punishments for violation include fines, temporary or permanent loss of driver's license, and imprisonment. Some jurisdictions have similar prohibitions for drunk sailing, drunk bicycling, and even drunk rollerblading. In many places in the United States, it is also illegal to have an open container of an alcoholic beverage in the passenger compartment of a vehicle.

Prohibition of drinking alcohol in public places

Americas

Barbados 
Barbados maintains 16 years of age as when a person is legally able to consume alcohol in public. Although being disorderly while intoxicated is illegal and the Barbados Police Force can be asked to evict drunken individuals from public establishments.

Brazil 

In Brazil, it is legal and usually socially acceptable to drink alcohol in public areas. Being publicly intoxicated is a misdemeanor, but laws are rarely, if ever, enforced.

Chile 

In Chile, it is illegal to drink alcohol in any public place or unlicensed facilities. The law may or may not be enforced, depending on the location, time of the day and the behavior of the offender.

Penalties may include the confiscation or seizure of the alcoholic beverage, fines or arrest.

United States 

Drinking alcohol in public places, such as streets and parks, is against the law in most of the United States, though there is no specific federal law that forbids the consumption of alcohol in public. Moreover, even when a state (such as Nevada, Louisiana, or Missouri) has no such ban, the vast majority of its cities and counties do have it. Some cities allow it in a specified area such as on the Las Vegas Strip in Las Vegas, Nevada, or during public festivals. Two notable exceptions are New Orleans, Louisiana, and Butte, Montana which allow public consumption of alcoholic beverages anywhere in the city.

Southeast Asia

Singapore 

From 1 April 2015, public drinking was banned from 10:30 p.m. to 7 a.m. daily.

Additional restrictions on public drinking are applied to Geylang and Little India which are declared Liquor Control Zones. The additional restrictions for Geylang and Little India are from 7 a.m. on Saturdays to 7 a.m. on Mondays and from 7 p.m. on the day before public holidays to 7 a.m. on the day after the public holiday. Retailers within the Liquor Control Zones are not allowed to sell takeaway liquor from 10:30 p.m. to 7 a.m. on weekdays (except on the day before public holidays and the day of public holidays) and from 7 p.m. to 7 a.m. on weekends, on the day before public holidays and on the day of public holidays. Retailers and F&B outlets are not allowed to sell liquor from 10:30 p.m. to 7 a.m. daily.

Europe

Restrictions by country 
According to data from the World Health Organization, drinking in public is regulated in the European countries for which data was provided as follows:
Educational buildings:
ban: Cyprus, Czech Republic, Finland, Hungary, Latvia, Lithuania, Luxembourg, Poland, Romania, Slovakia, Slovenia, Spain
partial restriction: Belgium, Estonia, France, Ireland, Italy, Malta, Netherlands, Sweden, UK
voluntary/self restricted: Austria, Bulgaria, Denmark, Germany
no restrictions: Greece, UK
Government offices:
ban: Cyprus, Czech Republic, Finland, Hungary, Latvia, Poland, Romania, Slovakia, Slovenia
partial restriction: France, Lithuania, Malta, Netherlands, Portugal, Spain
voluntary/self restricted: Austria, Belgium, Bulgaria, Denmark, Germany, Ireland, Italy, Sweden
no restrictions: Estonia, Greece, Luxembourg, UK
Healthcare establishments:
ban: Cyprus, Czech Republic, Finland, Hungary, Latvia, Lithuania, Malta, Portugal, Romania, Slovenia,
partial restriction: Belgium, France, Italy, Netherlands, Spain
voluntary/self restricted: Austria, Bulgaria, Germany, Ireland, Luxembourg, Poland, Sweden
no restrictions: Denmark, Greece, UK
Leisure events:
ban:
partial restriction: Cyprus, Czech Republic, Finland, France, Ireland, Portugal, Romania
voluntary/self restricted: Austria, Belgium, Bulgaria, Germany, Latvia, Poland, Slovakia, Sweden,
no restrictions: Denmark, Estonia, Greece, Hungary, Luxembourg, Slovenia, Spain, UK
Parks and streets:
ban: Estonia, Lithuania, Poland, Romania
partial restriction: Cyprus, Czech Republic, Finland, France, Ireland, Italy, Malta, Netherlands, Portugal, Slovakia, Spain, UK
voluntary/self restricted: Austria, Belgium, Bulgaria, Germany, Latvia, Slovenia, Sweden
no restrictions: Greece, Hungary, Luxembourg
Public transport:
ban: Cyprus, Finland, France, Greece, Romania, Slovakia,
partial restriction: Czech Republic, Denmark, Estonia, Hungary, Ireland, Lithuania, Malta, Netherlands, Poland, Portugal, Sweden, UK
voluntary/self restricted: Austria, Belgium, Bulgaria, Germany,
no restrictions: Italy, Luxembourg, Slovenia, Spain
Places of worship:
ban: Cyprus, Finland, Romania
partial restriction: France, Portugal
voluntary/self restricted: Belgium, Bulgaria, Czech Republic, Hungary, Ireland, Latvia, Malta, Sweden
no restrictions: Austria, Denmark, Estonia, Germany, Greece, Italy, Lithuania, Luxembourg, Netherland, Slovakia, Slovenia, Spain, UK
Sporting events:
ban: Romania, Slovenia, Spain
partial restriction: Cyprus, Czech Republic, Finland, France, Greece, Hungary, Ireland, Italy, Lithuania, Malta, Netherland, UK
voluntary/self restricted: Austria, Belgium, Bulgaria, German, Latvia, Slovakia, Sweden
no restrictions: Denmark, Estonia, Luxembourg
Workplaces:
ban: Czech Republic, Finland, Hungary, Latvia, Lithuania, Poland, Romania, Slovakia, Slovenia,
partial restriction: Cyprus, France, Italy, Malta, Portugal, Spain
voluntary/self restricted: Austria, Belgium, Bulgaria, Denmark, Germany, Ireland, Netherlands, Sweden, UK
no restrictions: Estonia, Greece, Luxembourg

Legend: ban = the consumption of alcohol is prohibited by law, violation may result in punishment.
partial restriction = in some states, regions, municipalities or cities the consumption of alcohol is prohibited by law; or the consumption is restricted at certain places but not generally prohibited.
voluntary/self-restricted = the consumption of alcohol is not prohibited by law, but (some) establishments may have own regulations prohibiting or regulating the consumption of alcohol voluntarily.
no restrictions = the consumption of alcohol is legal.

Legal drinking age 

Most countries have prescribed a legal drinking age which prohibits the purchase of alcohol by minors. Most countries also prohibit the consumption of alcohol to minors. Some countries have a tiered structure that limits the sale of stronger alcoholic drinks to older adults (typically based on the percentage of ABV) Other restrictions that some countries impose is based on the place in which alcohol is consumed, such as in the home, in a restaurant, or in a bar. The age at which these restrictions come to an end varies significantly from country to country, as does the degree to which it is enforced, which can also vary within a country.

Americas

Canada 

Under the Constitution of Canada, responsibility for enacting laws and regulations regarding the sale and distribution of alcoholic beverages in Canada is the sole responsibility of the ten provinces. Canada's three territories have also been granted similar autonomy over these matters under the provisions of federal legislation.

Most provinces of Canada enacted prohibition of alcohol sales, consumption and distribution between the years of 1910 and 1920. After prohibition was ended, most provinces had a minimum drinking age of 21 years, while in the early 70s the age limit was lowered to either 18 or 19 years of age. Later a few provinces and territories raised their age limit from 18 to 19 in the late 1970s and early 1980s.

Several provinces permits minors to consume alcohol if it was served to them by their parents/guardians, and it is consumed under their supervision in their home.
 Alberta:
 Alcohol legalized in 1924 – Minimum legal drinking age set at 21.
 Minimum legal drinking age lowered to 18 in 1970.
 British Columbia:
 Alcohol legalized in 1921 – Minimum legal drinking age set at 21.
 Minimum legal drinking age lowered to 19 in 1970.
 Manitoba:
 Alcohol legalized in 1921 – Minimum legal drinking age set at 21.
 Minimum legal drinking age lowered to 18 in 1970.
 Newfoundland and Labrador:
 Alcohol legalized in 1924 – Minimum legal drinking age set at 21.
 Minimum legal drinking age lowered to 19 in 1972.
 New Brunswick:
 Alcohol legalized in 1927 – Minimum legal drinking age set at 21.
 Minimum legal drinking age lowered to 19 in 1972.
 Northwest Territories:
 Alcohol legalized in 1891 – Minimum legal drinking age set at 21.
 Minimum legal drinking age lowered to 19 in 1970.
 Nova Scotia:
 Alcohol legalized in 1929 – Minimum legal drinking age set at 21.
 Minimum legal drinking age lowered to 19 in 1971.
 Ontario:
 Alcohol legalized in 1923 – Minimum legal drinking age set at 21.
 Minimum legal drinking age lowered to 18 in 1971.
 Minimum legal drinking age raised to 19 in 1979.
 Prince Edward Island:
 Alcohol legalized in 1948 – Minimum legal drinking age set at 21.
 Minimum legal drinking age lowered to 18 in 1970.
 Minimum legal drinking age raised to 19 in 1987.
 Québec:
 Alcohol legalized in 1929 – Minimum legal drinking age set at 20.
 Minimum legal drinking age lowered to 18 in 1972.
 Saskatchewan:
 Alcohol legalized in 1925 – Minimum legal drinking age set at 21.
 Minimum legal drinking age lowered to 18 in 1970.
 Minimum legal drinking age raised to 19 in 1976.
 Yukon:
 Alcohol legalized in 1920 – Minimum legal drinking age set at 21.
 Minimum legal drinking age lowered to 19 in 1972.

United States 

The legal age for buying and possessing (but not necessarily for drinking) has been 21 years in every state since shortly after the passage of the National Minimum Drinking Age Act in 1984, which tied federal highway funds to states' maintaining a minimum drinking age of 21.

Despite a rekindled national debate in 2008 on the established drinking age (initiated by several university presidents), a Fairleigh Dickinson University PublicMind poll found in September 2008 that 76% of New Jerseyans supported leaving the legal drinking age at 21 years. No significant differences emerged when considering gender, political affiliation, or region. However, parents of younger children were more likely to support keeping the age at 21 (83%) than parents of college-age students (67%).

Seventeen states (Arkansas, California, Connecticut, Florida, Kentucky, Maryland, Massachusetts, Mississippi, Missouri, Nevada, New Hampshire, New Mexico, New York, Oklahoma, Rhode Island, South Carolina, and Wyoming) and the District of Columbia have laws against possession of alcohol by minors, but they do not prohibit its consumption by minors.

Fourteen states (Alaska, Colorado, Delaware, Illinois, Louisiana, Maine, Minnesota, Missouri, Montana, Ohio, Oregon, Texas, Wisconsin, and Virginia) specifically permit minors to drink alcohol given to them by their parents or by someone entrusted by their parents.

Many states also permit the drinking of alcohol under the age of 21 for religious or health reasons.

Puerto Rico, a territory of the United States, has maintained a drinking age of 18.

United States customs laws stipulate that no person under the age of 21 may bring any type or quantity of alcohol into the country.

Europe

Taxation and regulation of production 

Alcoholic beverages are subject to excise taxes. Additionally, they fall under different jurisdiction than other consumables in many countries, with highly specific regulations and licensing on alcohol content, methods of production, and retail and restaurant sales. Alcohol tax is an excise tax, and while a demerit tax, is a significant source of revenue for governments. The U.S. government collected $5.8 billion in 2009. In history, the Whiskey Rebellion was caused by the introduction of an alcohol tax to fund the newly formed U.S. federal government.

In most countries, the commercial production of alcoholic beverages requires a license from the government, which then levies a tax upon these beverages. In many countries, alcoholic beverages may be produced in the home for personal use without a license or tax.

Denmark 
In Denmark, home production of wine and beer is not regulated. Home distillation of spirits is legal but not common because it is subject to the same tax as spirits sold commercially. Danish alcohol taxes are significantly lower than in Sweden and Norway, but higher than those of most other European countries.

Singapore 
In Singapore, alcohol production is regulated by Singapore Customs. Alcohol distillation is only allowed with a commercial license.

United Kingdom 
In the United Kingdom, HM Revenue and Customs issues distilling licenses, but people may produce beer and wine for personal consumption without a license.

United States 

The production of distilled beverages is regulated and taxed. The Bureau of Alcohol, Tobacco, Firearms, and Explosives and the Alcohol and Tobacco Tax and Trade Bureau (formerly a single organization called the Bureau of Alcohol, Tobacco and Firearms) enforce federal laws and regulations related to alcohol. All packaging of alcoholic products must contain a health warning from the Surgeon General.

In most of the American states, individuals may produce wine and beer for personal consumption (but not for sale) in amounts [usually] of up to 100 gallons per adult per year, but no more than 200 gallons per household per year.

The illegal (i.e., unlicensed) production of liquor in the United States is commonly referred to as "bootlegging." Illegally produced liquor (popularly called "moonshine" or "white lightning") is not aged and contains a high percentage of alcohol.

Restrictions on sale and possession 

Alcoholic drinks are available only from licensed shops in many countries, and in some countries, strong alcoholic drinks are sold only by a government-operated alcohol monopoly.

Scotland 
The Alcohol (Minimum Pricing) (Scotland) Act 2012 is an Act of the Scottish Parliament, which introduces a statutory minimum price for alcohol, initially 50p per unit, as an element in the programme to counter alcohol problems. The government introduced the Act to discourage excessive drinking. As a price floor, the Act is expected to increase the cost of the lowest-cost alcoholic beverages. The Act was passed with the support of the Scottish National Party, the Conservatives, the Liberal Democrats and the Greens. The opposition, Scottish Labour, refused to support the legislation because the Act failed to claw back an estimated £125m windfall profit from alcohol retailers. In April 2019, it was reported that, despite the legislation, consumption of alcohol in Scotland had increased.

Nordic countries 
In each of the Nordic countries, except Denmark, the government has a monopoly on the sale of liquor.

The state-run vendor is called Systembolaget in Sweden, Vinmonopolet in Norway, Alko in Finland, Vínbúð in Iceland, and Rúsdrekkasøla Landsins in the Faroe Islands. The first such monopoly was in Falun in the 19th century.

The governments of these countries claim that the purpose of these monopolies is to reduce the consumption of alcohol. These monopolies have had success in the past, but since joining the European Union it has been difficult to curb the importation of liquor, legal or illegal, from other EU countries. That has made the monopolies less effective in reducing excessive drinking.

There is an ongoing debate over whether to retain these state-run monopolies.

Norway 
In Norway, beers with an alcohol content of 4.74% by volume or less can be legally sold in grocery stores. Stronger beers, wines, and spirits can only be bought at government monopoly vendors. All alcoholic beverages can be bought at licensed bars and restaurants, but they must be consumed on the premises.

At the local grocery store, alcohol can only be bought before 8 p.m. (6 p.m. on Saturdays, municipalities can set stricter regulations). And the government monopoly vendors close at 6 p.m. Monday–Friday and 4 p.m. on Saturdays.
On Sundays, no alcohol can be bought, except in bars.

Norway levies some of the heaviest taxes in the world on alcoholic beverages, particularly on spirits. These taxes are levied on top of a 25% VAT on all goods and services. For example, 700 mL of Absolut Vodka currently retails at 300+ NOK.

Sweden 
In Sweden, beer with a low alcohol content (called folköl, 2.25% to 3.5% alcohol by weight) can be sold in regular stores to anyone aged 18 or over, but beverages with a high alcohol content can only be sold by government-run vendors to people aged 20 or older, or by licensed facilities such as restaurants and bars, where the age limit is 18. Alcoholic drinks bought at these licensed facilities must be consumed on the premises; nor is it allowed to bring and consume your own alcoholic beverages bought elsewhere.

North America

Canada 
In most Canadian provinces, there is a very tightly held government monopoly on the sale of alcohol. Two examples of this are the Liquor Control Board of Ontario, and the Liquor Distribution Branch of British Columbia. Government control and supervision of the sale of alcohol was a compromise devised in the 1920s between "drys" and "wets" for the purpose of ending Prohibition in Canada. Some provinces have moved away from government monopoly. In Alberta, privately owned liquor stores exist, and in Quebec a limited number of wines and liquors can be purchased at dépanneurs and grocery stores.

Canada has some of the highest excise taxes on alcohol in the world. These taxes are a source of income for governments and are also meant to discourage drinking. (See Taxation in Canada.) The province of Quebec has the lowest overall prices of alcohol in Canada.

Restrictions on the sale of alcohol vary from province to province. In Alberta, changes introduced in 2008 included a ban on "happy hour," minimum prices, and a limit on the number of drinks a person can buy in a bar or pub at one time after 1 a.m.

United States 

In the United States, the sale of alcoholic beverages is controlled by the individual states, by the counties or parishes within each state, and by local jurisdictions. In many states, alcohol can only be sold by staff qualified to serve responsibly through alcohol server training. A county that prohibits the sale of alcohol is known as a dry county. In some states, liquor sales are prohibited on Sunday by a blue law.

The places where alcohol may be sold or possessed, like all other alcohol restrictions, vary from state to state. Some states, like Louisiana, Missouri, and Connecticut, have very permissive alcohol laws, whereas other states, like Kansas and Oklahoma, have very strict alcohol laws.

Many states require that liquor may be sold only in liquor stores. In Nevada, Missouri, and Louisiana, state law does not specify the locations where alcohol may be sold.

In 18 alcoholic beverage control states, the state has a monopoly on the sale of liquor. For example, in most of North Carolina, beer and wine may be purchased in retail stores, but distilled spirits are only available at state ABC (Alcohol Beverage Control) stores. In Maryland, distilled spirits are available in liquor stores except in Montgomery County, where they are sold only by the county.

Most states follow a three-tier system in which producers cannot sell directly to retailers, but must instead sell to distributors, who in turn sell to retailers. Exceptions often exist for brewpubs (pubs which brew their own beer) and wineries, which are allowed to sell their products directly to consumers.

Most states also do not allow open containers of alcohol inside moving vehicles. The federal Transportation Equity Act for the 21st Century of 1999 mandates that, if a state does not prohibit open containers of alcohol inside moving vehicles, then a percentage of its federal highway funds will be transferred instead to alcohol education programs each year. As of December 2011, only one state (Mississippi) allows drivers to consume alcohol while driving (below the 0.08% limit), and only five states (Arkansas, Delaware, Mississippi, Missouri, and West Virginia) allow passengers to consume alcohol while the vehicle is in motion.

Four U.S. states limit alcohol sales in grocery stores and gas stations to beer at or below 3.2% alcohol: Kansas, Minnesota, Oklahoma, and Utah. In these states, stronger beverage sales are restricted to liquor stores. In Oklahoma, liquor stores may not refrigerate any beverage containing more than 3.2% alcohol. Missouri also has provisions for 3.2% beer, but its permissive alcohol laws (when compared to other states) make this type of beer a rarity.

Pennsylvania is starting to allow grocery stores and gas stations to sell alcohol. Wines and spirits are still sold at locations called "state stores", but wine kiosks are starting to be put in at grocery stores. The kiosks are connected to a database in Harrisburg, and purchasers must present valid ID, signature, and look into a camera for facial identification to purchase wine. Only after all of these measures are passed is the individual allowed to obtain one bottle of wine from the "vending machine". The kiosks are only open during the same hours as the state-run liquor stores and are not open on Sundays.

Alcoholic drinks were banned or restricted on U.S. Indian reservations for much of the 19th and twentieth centuries, until federal legislation in 1953 permitted Native Americans to legislate alcohol sales and consumption.

See also 
Wine law
Alcohol exclusion laws
Alcohol advertising
Drunk driving law by country
Public intoxication

References

External links 
 

 
 
Drug control law